Fazilnagar (also known as Pawanagar) is a community development block in the Kushinagar district of the state of Uttar Pradesh in India.

History
At the time of the Haryanka dynasty of Magadha, this place was known as Pāvā As such, it was the capital city of one of the two Malla republics of ancient India (the capital of the other Malla republic was located at Kushinagar).

According to the Mahāparinibbāṇa Sutta (Sutta 16 of the Dīgha Nikāya), Gautama Buddha visited this place during his final journey, as he traveled from Kesaputta (the capital of the Kālāma tribe) to Kushinagar. It was here, at Cunda's mango grove, where the Buddha ate what would be his last meal.

Location
NH 27 passes through Fazilnagar. It serves as a central market for the surrounding villages.

Language
The languages are Bhojpuri, Hindi, Urdu and English

References

Cities and towns in Kushinagar district